{{DISPLAYTITLE:C10H17N3S}}
The molecular formula C10H17N3S (molar mass: 211.33 g/mol, exact mass: 211.1143 u) may refer to:

 Dexpramipexole, or KNS-760704
 Pramipexole (Mirapex)